Donnell M. Rawlings (born December 6, 1968) is an American comedian, actor, and radio host. He is best known as a cast member on the Comedy Central sketch comedy TV series Chappelle's Show and the HBO drama The Wire.

Early life
Donnell Rawlings was born in Washington, D.C., and grew up in Alexandria, Virginia, with his mother. He attended T.C. Williams High School in Alexandria.

Rawlings served in the United States Air Force. He was stationed in South Korea and at Bolling Air Force Base in Washington, D.C., in the late 1980s and early 1990s.

Career

Chappelle's Show
Rawlings is most notable for frequently appearing in sketches on Chappelle's Show and hosting the third season along with Charlie Murphy. His catchphrase on the show was "I'm rich, biaaaaatch!" (which is played at the end of every episode as part of Dave Chappelle's vanity card) as well as frequently adding "Son!" at the end of each sentence.

He demonstrates his knowledge of broken Korean he learned in the Air Force in the sketches "Player Hater's Ball" and "The Time Haters", the latter of which was featured in the "Failures" episode. Rawlings reprises his role as the hater "Beautiful", known for wearing a Jheri curl and a suit similar to ones that Little Richard has worn. In the sketches, he responds to the comments of Korean hater "Mr. Roboto" with insults in Korean. He reprised the role of Beautiful on Chappelle's episode of Saturday Night Live.

On Heavy.com, Rawlings stars in a series of sketch comedy clips portraying his character Ashy Larry, from Chappelle's Show, called "From Ashy to Classy". Ashy Larry dreams of how his life would be if he were classy and dreams up a character who he calls Ashford Lawrence, a supposed reporter for heavy.com. Ashy Larry goes to different high-class establishments posing as a reporter, where eventually his girl comes and pulls him out at the end of each clip.

Other work
Rawlings also made appearances on HBO drama series The Corner, playing Bread the dope fiend next to Fat Curt and The Wire, playing Damien Lavelle 'Day-Day' Price, an ex-convict who is hired as a legislative aide and driver for corrupt state senator Clay Davis. Price's character appears unrefined on several occasions, contemplating heists in public and stating things in court such as "Y'all tryin' to 'criminate me" while on the stand. Davis is played by fellow Chappelle's Show co-star Isiah Whitlock, Jr.

Rawlings appears in Sam Raimi's Spider-Man 2 and in a cameo appearance in the music video for Jim Jones' "We Fly High" (Ballin' Remix). He was a regular on The Ricki Lake Show mostly as a judge on various challenge episodes.

In summer 2007, Rawlings was featured on the cover of the one-year anniversary issue of Beyond Race magazine. Rawlings was removed from his morning show post at Power 105's Ed Lover Show with Egypt and Ashy for a controversial comment the comedian made during the aftermath of the Don Imus controversy, responding to Ed Lover's comment "That's a cheap black man, Nickel-Black" with "that's a Jewish black guy."

Rawlings was also a contestant in the Comedy Central show Reality Bites Back. He appeared in sketches on D.L. Hughley Breaks the News and in Howard Stern's Howard TV On Demand original series, Show in the Hallway.

In July 2009, Rawlings recorded a clip imitating Stephon Marbury crying on his live webcast. Rawlings was a co-host on the Big Tigger Morning Show on Washington, D.C.'s radio station WPGC 95.5 from April 2010 to January 2011.

In 2011, Rawlings appeared on the MTV2 show Guy Code which he has done two seasons, as well as the show Hip Hop Squares. He is also the judge for a Guy Code spin-off, Guy Court.

Rawlings provided the voice of A Cat Named Rollo's brother A Cat Named Rallo in the Adult Swim show based on the 2009 R-rated movie Black Dynamite.

He also appeared on the April 23, 2014 episode of the Dr. Zoe Today show discussing his recent appearances with MTV and his comedy work.

In 2015, he guest starred as an angel that took Jesus' divinity during his time of doubt in the "A Very Special Christmas in Compton" episode of Black Jesus.

Rawlings voices the barber Dez in the 2020 Pixar movie Soul.

Filmography

Film

Television

Documentary

Comedy releases

Stand-up appearances

Podcasts

References

External links
 
 Comedy Central profile
 Donell Rawlings Interview at Clubplanet.com
 "From Ashy to Classy" at Heavy.com

1968 births
Living people
American male film actors
American male television actors
American male voice actors
American sketch comedians
Male actors from Atlanta
African-American male actors
African-American male comedians
American male comedians
Male actors from Washington, D.C.
United States Air Force airmen
Male actors from Georgia (U.S. state)
Male actors from Alexandria, Virginia
21st-century American comedians
T. C. Williams High School alumni
21st-century African-American people
20th-century African-American people